Devendra Lal FRS (14 February 1929 – 1 December 2012) was an Indian geophysicist.

Life
He was born in Varanasi, India. 
He graduated from Banaras Hindu University.
He graduated from Bombay University; his thesis was on cosmic ray physics; his thesis adviser was Bernard Peters.

He was Director, of the Physical Research Laboratory, Ahmedabad from 1972 to 1983.

He was Visiting Professor at Scripps Institution of Oceanography, University of California, San Diego, from 1989 to 2012.
Devendra Lal was President of the International Union of Geodesy and Geophysics (IUGG) from 1983 to 1987. He was also elected Fellow of the Royal Society in 1979.

References

External links
https://archive.today/20130628192705/http://paleowave.blogspot.com/2012/12/in-memoriam-devendra-lal-1929-2012.html
  Devendra Lal Memorial Symposium, Part 1
  Devendra Lal Memorial Symposium, Part 2

1929 births
2012 deaths
Indian geophysicists
Banaras Hindu University alumni
University of California, San Diego faculty
Fellows of the Royal Society
Foreign associates of the National Academy of Sciences
Scientists from Varanasi
Fellows of the Indian Geophysical Union
Recipients of the Padma Shri in science & engineering
20th-century Indian physicists
Presidents of the International Union of Geodesy and Geophysics
Recipients of the V. M. Goldschmidt Award